Bijiang District, is the seat of the city of Tongren, Guizhou province, People's Republic of China. The area was known as the county-level city of Tongren until November 2011, when it was renamed Bijiang District, and Tongren Prefecture converted to the prefecture-level city of Tongren.

Education
Institutions in Chuandong Education Park, Bijiang District include:
Tongren Polytechnic College
Tongren No.1 Middle School

References

External links
Official website of Tongren Government
中国经济网

Geography of Guizhou